Katherine Bay, alternatively spelt as Catherine Bay, is a bay located on the northwestern coast of Great Barrier Island, New Zealand. The bay was named in 1870 by Captain Nagle after his wife.

History 

The area around the bay was originally inhabited by Ngapuhi Māori since 1660.

During the early Colonial era of New Zealand in the mid-19th century extensive private and crown land purchases lead to only two areas of the Hauraki Gulf remained in Māori ownership: Te Huruhi (Surfdale) on Waiheke Island (2100 acres) and a 3,510 acre parcel of land at Katherine Bay on Great Barrier Island.

Typhoid epidemic 
In the August of 1937 Dr C. B. Gilbard and Mr. W. Armour reported a typhoid epidemic in a native settlement in Katherine Bay which had claimed the lives of three Māori adults and a child.

References 

Great Barrier Island